Jean Landry (born 3 October 1948 in Saint-Valère, Quebec) was a member of the House of Commons of Canada from 1993 to 1997. His career has included photography and food preparation.

He was elected in the Lotbinière electoral district under the Bloc Québécois party in the 1993 federal election, thus he served in the 35th Canadian Parliament. In Parliament, he questioned the government's policies on subsidies for dairy farmers. Upon the creation of the Canada Health and Social Transfer, Landry referred to it as "one of the worst incursions of federalism into provincial jurisdiction".

During the 1997 federal election, he faced a contested nominating convention within the BQ. Landry described himself as a "militant" member of the Parti Quebecois and accused other PQ members of infiltrating the local riding association. He came in 3rd place in the nomination convention, losing to Odina Desrochers. Landry decided to run as an independent and received 6% of the vote.

He joined the federalist Progressive Conservative party for the 2000 federal election and unsuccessfully campaigned for a Parliamentary seat in the Lotbinière—L'Érable riding. After electoral districts were restructured, Landry made another unsuccessful bid for Parliament in the 2004 federal election at the Lotbinière—Chutes-de-la-Chaudière riding, after his party became the Conservative party. He campaigned for the Conservatives again in the Richmond—Arthabaska riding in the 2006 general election.

In the 2021 Canadian federal election, Landry was the People's Party of Canada candidate in Trois-Rivières, but finished in 5th place.

Electoral record

References

External links
 

1948 births
Living people
Bloc Québécois MPs
Members of the House of Commons of Canada from Quebec

People's Party of Canada
20th-century Canadian politicians
21st-century Canadian politicians